Ramutė Aleksandra Jasudytė (born 30 November 1930 Kaunas) is a Lithuanian textile artist.

Her sister is Giedrė Konstancija Jasudytė.
In 1952 to 1958, she studied at Vilnius Art Institute, where she studied with Sofija Veiverytė, Juozas Balčikonis.
In 1957–1970, she worked at the "weaver" factory of artists, and in 1970–1972 she was Lithuanian Film Studio costume designer.

Since 1958, she participates exhibitions in Lithuania and abroad (Poland, Romania, Czechoslovakia, Hungary, Bulgaria, Sweden, Finland, Austria, France, Canada, Chile, USA, Italy).
Her solo exhibitions were held in Vilnius (1981), Kaunas (1981), Norway (1991).
Her works of public interiors in Vilnius and Moscow, Lithuanian Art Museum, the National M. K. Čiurlionis Museum of Art, private "memory." 1993 collections.

Works 
Her thematic, ornamental tapestries (Lietuvaitės "1968," Ships "in 1970, a rug I, II, 1987–1988," Loose "in 1990," surprise "in 1993," Duty "in 1996 – 1997, "Memory I, II, 1995, 2003," Goda "2001–2002," Farewell "2003–2005 Creator tapestries for interiors: series" Brothers "," Gulbelė "," Little Sisters "In 1972–1977, Vilnius University," Autumn in knowledge "of 1978–1979, the palace Tass in Moscow.

Awards 
 1981 Lithuanian State Prize of the Vilnius University, designed the interior monumental tapestries "against the Crusaders" (Triptych, 1972–1978) and "Song of the cycle," Lithuania "(1979–1980)

See also 
 List of Lithuanian painters

References

External links 
 "Ramutė Aleksandra Jasudytė", Lithuanian Wikipedia

Lithuanian painters
1930 births
Living people
Vilnius Academy of Arts alumni
20th-century Lithuanian women artists
21st-century Lithuanian women artists
Textile artists